Surprise Pool is a hot spring pool in the Lower Geyser Basin of Yellowstone National Park in the United States.  It is located near Great Fountain Geyser and A-0 Geyser.

Notes 

Geothermal features of Yellowstone National Park
Geothermal features of Teton County, Wyoming
Hot springs of Teton County, Wyoming
Hot springs of Wyoming